A special election for one judge of the International Criminal Court was held during the resumption of the 13th session of the Assembly of States Parties to the Rome Statute of the International Criminal Court which took place in The Hague from 24 to 25 June 2015.

The election became necessary after one judge elected in the 2011 election was unavailable: Miriam Defensor-Santiago had resigned from the bench on 3 June 2014.

Background 
The judge elected at this election was chosen to complete the term, until 10 March 2021, of the judge he replaced.

The election was governed by the Rome Statute of the International Criminal Court. Its article 36(8)(a) states that "[t]he States Parties shall, in the selection of judges, take into account the need, within the membership of the Court, for:
 (i) The representation of the principal legal systems of the world;
 (ii) Equitable geographical representation; and
 (iii) A fair representation of female and male judges."

Furthermore, article 36(3)(b) and 36(5) provide for two lists:
 List A contains those judges that "[h]ave established competence in criminal law and procedure, and the necessary relevant experience, whether as judge, prosecutor, advocate or in other similar capacity, in criminal proceedings";
 List B contains those who "[h]ave established competence in relevant areas of international law such as international humanitarian law and the law of human rights, and extensive experience in a professional legal capacity which is of relevance to the judicial work of the Court".

Each candidate must belong to exactly one list.

Further rules of election were adopted by a resolution of the Assembly of States Parties in 2004.

Nomination process 
Following these rules, the nomination period of judges for the 2015 special election lasted from 18 February to 31 March 2015 and could have been extended up to three times if there had been a lack of candidates from a group for which a minimum voting requirement was in place. The following persons were nominated:

The nomination dated 31 March 2015 of A.B.M. Khairul Haque of Bangladesh was withdrawn on 13 April 2015.

Minimum voting requirements 
Minimum voting requirements governed part of the election. This is to ensure that article 36(8)(a) cited above is fulfilled. For this election, the following minimum voting requirements existed; they could have been adjusted once the election is underway.

Regarding the List A or B requirement, there was no minimum voting requirement.

Regarding the regional criteria, there was a voting requirement for one judge from the Asia-Pacific States.

Regarding the gender criteria, there was no minimum voting requirement.

The regional criterion could have been adjusted even before the election depending on the number of candidates. Paragraph 20(b) of the ASP resolution that governs the elections states that if there are less than double the number of candidates required for each region, the minimum voting requirement shall be a (rounded-up) half of the number of candidates; except when there is only one candidate which results in no voting requirement. 

The regional criterion can be dropped if after four ballots the seat is not filled.

The voting requirements were as follows:

Ballots 
On 24 June 2015, Raul Cano Pangalangan of the Philippines was elected.

The ballot took place on 24 June 2015. The voting totals were as follows:

References

 Ele3ction,2015
2015 elections
Non-partisan elections
2015